The Secretary of the Central Committee of the League of Communists of Slovenia was the head of the League of Communists of Slovenia, heading the Central Committee of the Party. The holder of the office was, for a significant period, the de facto most influential politician in the Socialist Republic of Slovenia, a constituent republic of Yugoslavia. The official name of the office was changed in October 1966 to "President of the Central Committee" and in 1982 to President of the Presidency of the Central Committee of the League of Communists of Slovenia (Predsednik predsedstva Centralnega komiteja Zveze komunistov Slovenije).

The League of Communists of Slovenia was also an organization subordinate to the federal-level League of Communists of Yugoslavia. Between April 1937 and September 1952, the former was named the Communist Party of Slovenia (being part of the larger Communist Party of Yugoslavia), until both parties were renamed "League of Communists" in 1952.

List

Here follows a list of the seven officeholders:

See also
League of Communists of Slovenia
League of Communists of Yugoslavia
Socialist Republic of Slovenia
President of Slovenia
Prime Minister of Slovenia
List of presidents of the National Assembly of Slovenia
List of heads of state of Yugoslavia
Prime Minister of Yugoslavia
Politics of Slovenia

References

Communism in Slovenia
League of Communists of Slovenia politicians